The 1903 LSU Tigers football team represented the LSU of Louisiana State University during the 1903 Southern Intercollegiate Athletic Association football season. 1903 was W. S. Borland's third and final season as LSU head coach as he finished 4–5 for the season (15–7 in all three years as head coach). The 1903 season broke the previous season's record for most games played (seven) with nine games. The Tigers played four home games; three in Baton Rouge and one in New Orleans, but were on the road the rest of the season.  For the 1903 season, point values were different from those used in contemporary games. In 1903 a touchdown was worth five points, a field goal was worth five points and a conversion (PAT) was worth one point.

Schedule

References

LSU
LSU Tigers football seasons
LSU Tigers football